Paulette Madeleine Georgette Louise Fouillet (30 June 1950 - 29 July 2015) was a French judoka who competed in international elite events. She was a double World silver medalist, triple European champion and four-time French national champion.

Fouillet died of a short illness aged 65 on 29 July 2015.

References

External links
 

1950 births
2015 deaths
Sportspeople from Angers
French female judoka
20th-century French women
21st-century French women